Odessa Township is a civil township in Buffalo County, Nebraska, United States. The census-designated place of Odessa is located in the south-central part of the township. The township is in the Central Standard Time Zone.

The latitude of Odessa Township is 40.722° N; the longitude is 99.253° W. The population was 398 at the 2000 census. A 2006 estimate placed the township's population at 391.

Attractions
Union Pacific State Recreation Area - Boating, fishing and camping areas.

References

External links
 Odessa Community Profile
 City-Data.com
 

Townships in Buffalo County, Nebraska
Kearney Micropolitan Statistical Area
Townships in Nebraska